The white-billed starling (Onychognathus albirostris) is a species of starling in the family Sturnidae. It is found in Eritrea and Ethiopia.

Habitat
In the Degua Tembien district it was found on steep cliffs.

References

white-billed starling
Birds of East Africa
white-billed starling
Taxonomy articles created by Polbot